Tim Membrey (born 26 May 1994) is an Australian rules footballer who plays for the St Kilda Football Club in the Australian Football League (AFL).

Playing career

Early career 
Membery grew up in Traralgon and attended St Gabriel's Primary School. Membrey participated in the Auskick program at Traralgon, he played junior football for Traralgon Football Club and was Captain of the Gippsland Power. Membrey would play against future St Kilda teammate Jack Billings in the under 18 Grand Final, where Billings' Oakleigh Chargers won by a point.

Sydney Swans (2013–2014)
He was drafted to the Sydney Swans with the 46th pick in 2012 AFL Draft.  Membrey was mentored by dual Brownlow Medalist Adam Goodes while at the Swans. Membrey had to wait until round 19, 2014 to make his debut against Essendon, when he was a late replacement for an injured Lance Franklin. In his two years in Sydney, Membrey struggled to break into a Swans lineup that included forwards Franklin, Kurt Tippet and his mentor Goodes. He played 41 games for the Swans Reserves in the North East Australian Football League, kicking 105 goals (an average of 2.5 goals per match). Following the lack of opportunities at the Swans, Membrey requested a trade to St Kilda. The two clubs could not agree on a trade and with Membrey out of contract, Sydney delisted the forward. Membrey then signed with St Kilda as a delisted free agent. On his departure, Sydney Coach John Longmire said to Membrey  "we know you’re good enough to play senior football. As much as we want you, you have our blessing to leave." Saints' Chief Operating Officer Ameet Bains stated that Membrey was "a player that we liked a lot during his 2012 draft and came close to drafting."

St Kilda (2015–present)

In his first season as a Saint, Membrey kicked nine goals in 12 senior games. He debuted in round one against GWS, where he kicked two goals. At the end of the season, Membrey injured his shoulder at training and required a shoulder reconstruction.

2016 was a breakout season for Membrey, and was the club's leading goalkicker for the year with 44 goals in just 17 games (an average of 2.5 goals per game). The 22-year old was awarded for his good year with a 2-year contract extension.

Membrey continued his run of good form throughout 2017, playing 20 games, averaging just under 13 disposals a game and kicking 38 goals to be the Saints' leading goal-kicker for the second season in a row. 

Membrey played every possible game for the Saints in 2018, the first time in his career he had played the entire season. Membrey kicked 34 goals for the year, a single goal behind the leading goal-kicker for 2018, Jade Gresham. Membrey signed a further 2-year extension at the end of the season. 

Membrey was added to the five-man leadership group ahead of the 2019 season, after he began sitting in on leadership discussions towards the end of 2018. Thes Saints had a difficult season, registering only nine wins. Membrey kicked 44 goals, an equal career-high, and played all 22 games. Membrey's 44 goals saw him capture his third club leading-goalkicker award in four years. Membrey kicked three bags of four goals, and scored three goals in four matches.

Membrey was again part of the leadership group in 2020. In a Covid-interrupted year, Membrey played 18 of a possible 19 matches - including two finals as the Saints saw their first September action since 2011. He kicked 20 goals for the year.

Ahead of the 2021 season, Membrey was named co-Vice Captain alongside Dougal Howard. As he was delisted by the Swans in 2014, Membrey was eligible for the 'free agency for life' clause in 2021. However, he immediately signed a three year contract with the Saints through to 2024. 

Membrey played a prolific game in wet, post-storm conditions in Sydney in the Saints' round one win over GWS. Membrey collected 21 disposals at 81 per cent efficiency, three goals, seven marks, seven inside-50s and a team-high 586 metres gained. He finished third in the 2021 Trevor Barker Award.

Statistics
 Statistics are correct to the end of the 2021 season

|-  style="background-color: #EAEAEA"
! scope="row" style="text-align:center" | 2014
|
| 1 || 1 || 0 || 0 || 5 || 4 || 9 || 4 || 1 || 0 || 0 || 5 || 4 || 9 || 4 || 1
|-  style="background-color: #EAEAEA"
! scope="row" style="text-align:center" | 2015
|
| 28 || 12 || 9 || 7 || 73 || 53 || 126 || 48 || 24 || 0.75 || 0.58 || 6.08 || 4.42 || 10.50 || 4.00 || 2.00
|-
|- style="background-color: #EAEAEA"
! scope="row" style="text-align:center" | 2016
|
| 28 || 17 || 44 || 18 || 149 || 71 || 220 || 103 || 27 || 2.59 || 1.06 || 8.76 || 4.18 || 12.94 || 6.06 || 1.59
|- style="background-color: #EAEAEA"
! scope="row" style="text-align:center" | 2017
|
| 28 || 20 || 38 || 14 || 185 || 74 || 259 || 74 || 30 || 1.90 || 0.70 || 9.25 || 3.70 || 12.95 || 6.50 || 1.50
|- style="background-color: #EAEAEA"
! scope="row" style="text-align:center" | 2018
|
| 28 || 22 || 34 || 28 || 165 || 82 || 247 || 132 || 23 || 1.70 || 1.40 || 8.25 || 4.10 || 12.35 || 6.60 || 1.15
|- style="background-color: #EAEAEA"
! scope="row" style="text-align:center" | 2019
|
| 28 || 22 || 44 || 17 || 181 || 105 || 286 || 124 || 37 || 2.00 || 0.77 || 8.23 || 4.77 || 13.00 || 5.64 || 1.68
|- style="background-color: #EAEAEA"
! scope="row" style="text-align:center" | 2020 
|
| 28 || 18 || 20 || 9 || 129 || 55 || 184 || 83 || 27 || 1.11 || 0.50 || 7.17 || 3.05 || 10.22 || 4.61 || 1.50
|- style="background-color: #EAEAEA"
! scope="row" style="text-align:center" | 2021
|
| 28 || 21 || 34 || 26 || 227 || 85 || 312 || 151 || 22 || 1.62 || 1.24 || 10.81 || 4.05|| 14.86 || 7.19 || 1.05
|- class="sortbottom"
! colspan=3| Career
! 131
! 223
! 119
! 1114
! 529
! 1643
! 775
! 191
! 1.70
! 0.91
! 8.50
! 4.04
! 12.54
! 5.92
! 1.46
|-
|}

Notes

References

External links

1994 births
Australian rules footballers from Victoria (Australia)
Living people
Sydney Swans players
Gippsland Power players
Traralgon Football Club players
St Kilda Football Club players
Sandringham Football Club players